Carolina Milena Jaume Saporiti (born 18 October 1986) is an Ecuadorian television actress and presenter.

Biography
Carolina Jaume was born on 18 October 1985 in Ecuador's largest city, Guayaquil, to parents Rafael Jaume of Puerto Rico and Diana Saporiti, a former television producer from Ecuador. Jaume started early in TV acting, but left during her adolescence until she was 19, when she entered the 2004 Queen of Guayaquil contest, being declared "Star of October." In 2007, Jaume would give birth to the couple's daughter, but the marriage ended one year later, in 2009.

In 2008, Jaume starred in the telenovela  and the following year participated in the comedy La Panadería and telenovela , but left both before completion when she resigned from Ecuavisa. Eventually, she would find herself in Channel One working as a presenter, but would leave Channel One as well in 2015 and marry Ecuadorian businessman Allan Zenck and give birth to another child. From there, Jaume would help in the staging of Mujer que se respeta with Claudia Camposano and Marcela Ruete.

However, due to a difference of opinion with fellow judge Paola Farias, her contract was not renewed and she left the company a second time.

Citations

1985 births
Living people
Ecuadorian television actresses
Ecuadorian television presenters
Ecuadorian women television presenters
21st-century Ecuadorian women